West Chatham is a census-designated place (CDP) in the town of Chatham in Barnstable County, Massachusetts, United States. The population was 1,410 at the 2010 census.

Geography
West Chatham is located in the southwest part of the town of Chatham at  (41.680661, -69.987547). It is bordered to the east by the Chatham CDP and to the southwest by Nantucket Sound.

Demographics

As of the census of 2000, there were 1,446 people, 706 households, and 429 families residing in the CDP. The population density was 189.9/km (491.5/mi). There were 1,687 housing units at an average density of 221.5/km (573.5/mi). The racial makeup of the CDP was 96.06% White, 1.04% Black or African American, 0.14% Native American, 0.21% Asian, 1.52% from other races, and 1.04% from two or more races. Hispanic or Latino of any race were 0.90% of the population.

There were 706 households, out of which 18.0% had children under the age of 18 living with them, 52.4% were married couples living together, 6.1% had a female householder with no husband present, and 39.2% were non-families. 33.7% of all households were made up of individuals, and 15.4% had someone living alone who was 65 years of age or older. The average household size was 2.03 and the average family size was 2.55.

In the CDP, the population was spread out, with 14.9% under the age of 18, 4.6% from 18 to 24, 24.3% from 25 to 44, 29.3% from 45 to 64, and 26.8% who were 65 years of age or older. The median age was 50 years. For every 100 females, there were 96.2 males. For every 100 females age 18 and over, there were 91.6 males.

The median income for a household in the CDP was $42,300, and the median income for a family was $56,250. Males had a median income of $39,554 versus $37,344 for females. The per capita income for the CDP was $26,468. About 5.8% of families and 8.1% of the population were below the poverty line, including 18.8% of those under age 18 and none of those age 65 or over.

References

Chatham, Massachusetts
Census-designated places in Barnstable County, Massachusetts
Census-designated places in Massachusetts